Vijaigarh is a town and a nagar panchayat in Aligarh district in the Indian state of Uttar Pradesh.

Demographics
 India census, Vijaigarh had a population of 5921. Males constitute 53% of the population and females 47%. Vijaigarh has an average literacy rate of 57%, lower than the national average of 59.5%: male literacy is 66%, and female literacy is 47%. In Vijaigarh, 17% of the population is under 6 years of age.

References

Cities and towns in Aligarh district